Mitali Banerjee Bhawmik is an exponent of Hindustani classical vocal music.

Early life 
Mitali Banerjee Bhawmik was born in Nagaon, Assam. She was introduced to Hindustani classical music by her mother.

References

External links
Official website

Living people
21st-century Indian women classical singers
Year of birth missing (living people)
Place of birth missing (living people)